is a private junior college for women in Taitō, Tokyo, Japan. It was established in 1952 in Taitō, Tokyo, then moved to Sōka, Saitama, before moving back to Taitō, Tokyo in 2005.

See also
 List of junior colleges in Japan

External links
  

Japanese junior colleges
Universities and colleges in Tokyo